Bull Canyon Spring is a spring in Bull Canyon, in the upper reach of Palm Canyon, in Riverside County, California.

References

Bodies of water of Riverside County, California